Free agency in Major League Baseball (MLB) concerns players whose contracts with a team have expired and who are therefore eligible to sign with another team. Free agents may be eligible for pendulum arbitration, also called "salary arbitration" or just "arbitration" in baseball circles.

History

Free agency in MLB has existed since the 1972 Flood v. Kuhn Supreme Court case.  One of the landmark decisions in the aftermath was the Messersmith/McNally Arbitration, also known as the Seitz Decision, which effectively destroyed the "reserve clause" in baseball. With the end of the reserve clause, the players and the league negotiated a new collective bargaining agreement which was signed on July 12, 1976. It gave players a broader range of options as free agents.

In Major League Baseball, free agents were previously classified as either Type A, Type B, or unclassified. Type A free agents were those determined by the Collective Bargaining Agreement to be in the top 20% of all players based on the previous two seasons. Type B free agents were those in the next 20%. Unclassified free agents were those in the bottom 60% of players. Teams that lost a Type A free agent to whom they had offered arbitration received the top draft pick from the team that signed the free agent, plus a supplemental draft pick in the upcoming draft as compensation. Teams losing Type B free agents to whom they had offered arbitration received only a supplemental pick as compensation. Teams that have lost unclassified free agents, or who did not offer arbitration to classified free agents, did not receive any compensation.

The collective bargaining agreement between MLB and its players union, signed on November 22, 2011, and taking effect in the 2012 season, dramatically changed free agent compensation. Players were no longer classified by type; if a player has six or more years of major-league service (on the team's 40-man roster) and is not under contract for the following season, he is automatically a free agent. The team can offer him an arbitration salary if they want to be able to receive draft pick compensation, and such an offer must be at least the average of the 125 richest contracts. However, if a player is traded during the final season of his contract, his new team will be ineligible to receive any draft pick compensation.

Eligibility

If a player is drafted and is offered a contract by his drafting team (or any team to which he is traded) each year, he may not become a free agent until:
His contract has expired with at least six years of service time on a major league 26-man roster or injured list (formerly the 25-man roster and disabled list, respectively), OR
His contract has expired with less than six years of service time, but the player first signed with a Major League Baseball team as a 10-year free agent from the Japanese major leagues (NPB), OR
His contract has expired with less than six years of service time, but is not tendered a contract or salary arbitration offer (if eligible) by the tender deadline (usually at the end of November). Such players become non-tender free agents.

Two examples of players falling under (2) above are Hideki Okajima and Hiroki Kuroda.

A player with fewer than six years of service time is eligible for salary arbitration if he:

is without a contract for the next season, AND
has been tendered a contract offer by his current team by the tender deadline, AND
cannot agree with his current team on a new contract, AND
meets one of the conditions below:
has been on a major league roster or injured list for at least three years, OR
has at least two years of major league service but less than three, AND is among the top 22 percent for cumulative playing time in the majors in this class of players (and ties), AND was on an active major-league roster for at least 86 days in the previous season.

Players with more than six years of service time and who are eligible for free agency can also be offered arbitration when their contracts are up, if they have been tendered a contract offer by their current team by the tender deadline, and have not agreed on a contract.

The 4.2 example of arbitration eligibility above is called the "Super Two" exception, in which a player will have an extra year of arbitration eligibility. Notable "Super Two" players include Nolan Arenado, Chris Archer, Anthony Rendon, and Avisail Garcia.
Following the salary arbitration process, the player and the team both submit a salary offer for a new contract. The arbitrator chooses one number or the other, based on which offer is closest to the salaries of players with similar ability and service time.

For purposes of salary arbitration and free agency, a player acquires a year of service time if the player remains on the major league roster for at least 172 days of the typical 187-day season.

Players eligible for neither free agency nor salary arbitration are very seldom offered contracts for much more than the league minimum salary, as the player has no recourse to try to obtain a better salary elsewhere. For this reason, in the first three major league years of their careers (except for the "Super Two" exception above), it is standard practice for players to accept comparatively low salaries even when their performance is stellar. Occasionally, a team may wish to sign a player in his second or third year to a long-term contract, and the resulting negotiations can involve salaries significantly higher than minimum. A recent example is the contract Ryan Braun signed barely a year into his major league career, which would have taken him through 2015. However, in April 2011, he and the Milwaukee Brewers extended that contract through 2020.

A team does not have to offer a contract to a player not eligible for free agency if his contract has expired, regardless of service time. If the player is not tendered a contract offer by the tender deadline (usually in the second week of December), the player becomes a non-tender free agent.

If a player becomes a free agent without accruing six years of service time and is not a 10-year NPB free agent, they will still be subject to service time rules with their new club. For this reason, these free agents are typically only signed to a one-year contract as nothing further is required to maintain team control if the player will have less than six years’ service time at the end of that year. For example, Derek Dietrich became a free agent after being designated for assignment by the Miami Marlins and elected to become a free agent instead. He was signed by the Cincinnati Reds for the 2019 season on a minor league deal. The Reds selected his contract for the 2019 season and he had accrued five years of service time at the beginning of the 2020 season. He was under the Reds’ team control and was eligible for arbitration as if he had remained with a single team. Dietrich became a free agent in 2021.

See also
 Service time manipulation, tactics used by baseball team executives to prevent players from becoming eligible for free agency

References

External links
 Free Agency definition on MLB.com

Major League Baseball labor relations